Yellow Rock may refer to:

 Yellow Rock, New South Wales (Blue Mountains), Australia
 Yellow Rock, New South Wales (Shellharbour), Australia
Yellow Rock, Kentucky, United States